Krzysztof Chrobak (born 3 October 1957) is a Polish football manager.

References

1957 births
Living people
Sportspeople from Warsaw
Polish football managers
Polonia Warsaw managers
Znicz Pruszków managers
Amica Wronki managers
Górnik Łęczna managers
Lech Poznań managers